Muskerry GAA is a Gaelic football and hurling division located in the middle region of County Cork, Ireland. It is one of eight divisions of Cork GAA County Board. The division includes clubs from areas to the west of Cork city stretching to the county bounds with Kerry. Its name is derived from the ancient Gaelic kingdom of Múscraige which, following the Norman conquest, now encompasses the baronies of Muskerry West and Muskerry East. These baronies, or half-baronies, include towns such as Macroom, Ballincollig, and Ballingeary.  Muskerry GAA is bordered by Carrigdhoun GAA and Carbery GAA divisions to the south and by Duhallow GAA to the north. It organizes competitions for the clubs within the division, from "Under 12" up to the adult level. The winners of these competitions compete against other divisional champions to determine which club is the county champion. In addition, the division selects football and hurling teams from the adult teams playing at junior level or county intermediate level; these then compete for the Cork Senior Football Championship and Cork Senior Hurling Championship.

History
The division was established in 1925. Hurling was the major game in the division at that time and the 1925 Junior Championship Draws tell their own story.

Junior hurling (9 teams):
 Cloughduv v Ballinora
 Inniscarra v Aghabullogue
 Macroom v Blarney
 Shournagh Valley v Ballincollig
 Bye Bride Valley

Junior football (3 teams):
 Kilmurry v Macroom
 Bye Bride Valley

To address the position of junior football in the Western area, a meeting was held in Ballincollig on 11 January 1925. The following motion was referred to the Annual Convention in Macroom 'That a Sub - Committee be appointed to carry on and organize football in the Western end of the Division'. The game is exceptionally strong in the division at present.

A Minor Hurling Championship was introduced in 1926. The following year a Minor Football Championship was introduced.

More clubs were formed which participated in both codes and all championships.

Competitions have continued to increase in number with a Junior (B) Hurling Championship being introduced in the 1940s and a Junior (B) Football Championship being introduced in 1961.

Under 21 championships in both codes were introduced in 1963 and as the facilities in the division improved beyond all recognition, the activities on the field of play have continued to increase and multiply.

24 competitions involving 21 clubs were organised this current year and they were all keenly contested. The standard of play was high and the division was well represented on all the codes' All Ireland winning teams. The Muskerry divisional teams have participated in the Senior Championships in both codes on a regular basis and they have generally given good accounts of themselves.

In football the historic outright Cork Senior Football Championship Title victory in 1970 was a particularly significant achievement. The senior footballers also did well to contest finals in 1962, 1995, and 2005. In senior hurling, Muskerry came close to making it a Senior County Championship Double in 1970, when they were two points behind U.C.C. at the end of an exciting Cork Senior Hurling Championship Final.

The First Officers of the Muskerry Divisional Board in 1925 were:

 Chairman, William Fitzgerald (Bride Valley)
 Secretary, Jimmy Long (Ballinora)
 Treasurer, D.J. Walsh (Inniscarra)

Achievements
 Cork Senior Football Championship, winner (1) 1970
 Cork Senior Hurling Championship, runner-up 1970

List of clubs
 Aghabullogue
 Aghinagh
 Ballincollig
 Béal Átha Ghaorthaidh
 Ballinora
 Blarney
 Canovee
 Cill Na Martra
 Clondrohid
 Cloughduv
 Donoughmore
 Dripsey
 Éire Óg
 Grenagh
 Gleann na Laoi
 Inniscarra
 Iveleary
 Kilmurry
 Kilmichael
 Laochra Óg
 Macroom
 Naomh Abán

Notable players
 Fintan Goold
 Daniel Goulding
 Tom Kenny
 Mick Malone
 John O'Driscoll
 Noel O'Leary
 Ciarán Sheehan

Divisional competitions
 Mid Cork Junior A Football Championship
 Mid Cork Junior A Hurling Championship

Hurling

Grades

Football

Grades

References

External links
 Muskerry Divisional website
 Kilmichael club website
 Inniscarra club website
 Kilmurry club website
 Ballingeary club website

1925 establishments in Ireland
Divisional boards of Cork GAA
Gaelic Athletic Association clubs established in 1925
Gaelic games clubs in County Cork
Gaelic football clubs in County Cork
Hurling clubs in County Cork